Clifford Lawrence Doan (April 27, 1905 – November 25, 1990) was a provincial level politician from Alberta, Canada. He served as a member of the Legislative Assembly of Alberta from 1971 to 1979 sitting with the governing Progressive Conservative caucus.

Political career
Doan ran for a seat to the Alberta Legislature in the 1971 Alberta general election. He ran against Social Credit incumbent William Ure in the new electoral district of Innisfail. Doan won the straight fight defeating Ure by less than 300 votes.

Doan ran for re-election in the 1975 Alberta general election. He faced three other opposing candidates and increased his popular support. The opposition vote collapsed and he won the district with a near landslide. Doan retired from provincial politics at dissolution of the assembly in 1979.

References

External links
Legislative Assembly of Alberta Members Listing

Progressive Conservative Association of Alberta MLAs
1905 births
1990 deaths